Tazlina Tower is an  elevation glaciated summit located  northwest of Valdez in the Chugach Mountains of the U.S. state of Alaska. Tazlina Tower was named in association with the glacier, in 1959, by Lawrence E. Nielsen of the Chugach Mountains Expedition, which was sponsored by the Arctic Institute of North America. In turn, the glacier, Tazlina Lake, and Tazlina River are traced to the Ahtna language, "tezlina", meaning "swift river." The mountain's name was officially adopted in 1965 by the U.S. Board on Geographic Names.

Climate

Based on the Köppen climate classification, Tazlina Tower is located in a subarctic climate zone with long, cold, snowy winters, and mild summers. Weather systems coming off the Gulf of Alaska are forced upwards by the Chugach Mountains (orographic lift), causing heavy precipitation in the form of rainfall and snowfall. Temperatures can drop below −20 °C with wind chill factors below −30 °C. This climate supports the Tazlina Glacier and the immense Columbia Glacier surrounding this mountain. The months May through June offer the most favorable weather for climbing or viewing.

See also

List of mountain peaks of Alaska
Geography of Alaska

References

External links
 Weather: Tazlina Tower

Mountains of Alaska
Landforms of Copper River Census Area, Alaska
North American 2000 m summits